Methyllinderone is a bio-active isolate of Lindera lucida.

References

Phytochemicals